Hebrew poetry is poetry written in the Hebrew language.  It encompasses such things as:

 Biblical poetry, the poetry found in the poetic books of the Hebrew Bible
 Piyyut, religious Jewish liturgical poetry in Hebrew or Aramaic 
 Medieval Hebrew poetry written in Hebrew
 Modern Hebrew poetry, poetry written after the revival of the Hebrew language

See also
List of Hebrew-language poets
Hebrew literature
Israeli literature
Jewish literature